Seydou Traoré (born September 17, 1970 in Grand Lahou) is a former Burkinabé footballer.

Career
He played as a forward for FC Bressuire, Qatar SC, Al-Ain and Al-Qadisiya.

International career
Traoré has played for the Burkina Faso national football team at the 2000 African Cup of Nations.

Notes

1970 births
Citizens of Burkina Faso through descent
Burkinabé footballers
Living people
Al Ain FC players
Al Ahli Club (Dubai) players
Burkina Faso international footballers
1996 African Cup of Nations players
1998 African Cup of Nations players
2000 African Cup of Nations players
Burkinabé expatriate footballers
Expatriate footballers in Kuwait
Qatar SC players
Ivorian people of Burkinabé descent
Sportspeople of Burkinabé descent
People from Lagunes District
Qatar Stars League players
UAE Pro League players
Association football forwards
Rail Club du Kadiogo players
Burkinabé expatriate sportspeople in Kuwait
Burkinabé expatriate sportspeople in Qatar
Burkinabé expatriate sportspeople in the United Arab Emirates
Expatriate footballers in Qatar
Expatriate footballers in the United Arab Emirates
Kuwait Premier League players
Expatriate footballers in France
Burkinabé expatriate sportspeople in France
Africa Sports d'Abidjan players
Shabab Al-Ahli Club players
Al Ahli SC (Doha) players
21st-century Burkinabé people